The Basilica Aemilia was a civil basilica in the Roman Forum, in Rome, Italy. Today only the plan and some rebuilt elements can be seen.  The Basilica was 100 meters (328 ft) long and about 30 meters (98 ft) wide.  Along the sides were two orders of 16 arches, and it was accessed through one of three entrances.

History

Pre-existing building
The new basilica was built on a site of the 5th-century BC tabernae lanienae ("butcher shops") and later (4th century BC) the tabernae argentariae. The latter housed the city's bankers, and after a fire was renamed tabernae novae ("new shops"). The square had two facing rows of shops. A first basilica had been built behind the tabernae argentariae between 210 BC and 195-191 BC, the date in which it is mentioned by Plautus. Archaeological studies have shown that this building comprised three naves paved with tuff from Monteverde, the back façade having a portico which opened to the Forum Piscatorium and the Macellum (the area later occupied by the Forum of Nerva).

The Basilica Fulvia-Aemilia
It was erected in 179 BC by censor Marcus Fulvius Nobilior with the name of Basilica Fulvia. After the latter's death, his colleague Marcus Aemilius Lepidus completed it, and it was frequently restored and redecorated by the members of the Aemilian gens, giving the basilica its current name.

The 78 BC consul, also called Marcus Aemilius Lepidus, embellished it with the clipei ("shields"). This intervention is recalled in a coin from 61 BC by his son, the triumvir Marcus Aemilius Lepidus.

According to other scholars, however, the Basilica Aemilia formed a different edifice from the Basilica Fulvia.

In the year 50BCE, Julius Caesar "...gave the consul Paulus fifteen hundred talents with which he added to the beauty of the forum by building the famous Basilica which was erected in the place of the one called "the Fulvia".

The Basilica Paulli

A new edifice in substitution of the Basilica Fulvia was begun in 55 BC by Lucius Aemilius Lepidus Paullus, and inaugurated by his son in 34 BC. This edifice had similar lines to the preceding one; however with a reduced length and a second nave in lieu of the back portico.

The columns in the central nave, in African marble, had Corinthian capitals and friezes with deeds from the history of Republican Rome. The columns in the second row were in cipolline marble and, finally, the external ones had Ionic capitals.

After a fire, Augustus in 14 BC heavily restored the edifice. In this occasion the tabernae which preceded it towards the Forum square and the portico were totally rebuilt. The latter was dedicated to the emperor's two grandsons (Porticus Gai et Luci): it had two orders of arcades with pilasters and Doric semi-columns. The two upper floors of the basilica were totally rebuilt. Over the upper order an attic was built, decorated with vegetable elements and statues of barbarians.

The basilica was restored again in 22 AD. On its two-hundredth anniversary, the Basilica Aemilia was considered by Pliny to be one of the most beautiful buildings in Rome. It was a place for business and, in the porticus of Gaius and Lucius (the grandsons of Augustus) fronting the Roman Forum, there were the Tabernae Novae (New Shops). The main hall or court (100 m long and 29.9 m deep) was located behind the shops.

The wooden roof, the Tabernae as well as the facade of the basilica were completely destroyed by fire when Rome was sacked by Alaric the Visigoth in 410 AD. On the colored marble floor one still can see the green stains of bronze coins from the early fifth century that melted in the fire. The basilica was rebuilt after the fire by adding a new floor while the central part of the front porch was replaced by a portico in c.420 with columns of pink granite on bases, much more dense than the pillars of the porch above (three of these columns were rebuilt after the excavations and are still on the east side toward the temple of Antoninus and Faustina). An earthquake in 847 caused the final collapse of the remaining structure. The remains were used as building material. Conspicuous remains of the basilica could still be seen in the Renaissance, they were however used for the Palazzo Giraud Torlonia.

Gallery

References

External links 

Buildings and structures completed in the 1st century BC
Buildings and structures completed in the 2nd century BC
Aemilia
Roman Forum
Rome R. X Campitelli